

Mongolian Sign Language is a sign language used in Mongolia. Ethnologue estimates that there are between 9,000 and 15,000 deaf signers in Mongolia .  Mongolian Sign Language is widely used in areas where the Mongolian diaspora has immigrated.  Such locations include California, Houston, and Charleston.

A school for the deaf was established in Mongolia in 1964 by the occupying Soviet Union. This resulted in many similarities between MSL and Russian Sign Language (RSL) for a time, but the two languages have since developed to be separate and distinct.

Linda Ball, a Peace Corps volunteer in Mongolia, is believed to have created the first dictionary of MSL in 1995. In 2007, another MSL dictionary with 3,000 entries was published by Mongolia's Ministry of Education, Culture, and Science with assistance from UNESCO.

Notes

Sources

Further reading

Baljinnyam, N. 2007. A study of the developing Mongolian Sign Language. Master’s thesis, Mongolian State University of Education, Ulaanbaatar.
Geer, L. (2011). Kinship in Mongolian Sign Language. Sign Language Studies 11(4):594–605.
Geer, Leah. 2012. Sources of Variation in Mongolian Sign Language. Texas Linguistics Forum 55:33-42. (Proceedings of the Twentieth Annual Symposium About Language and Society—Austin) Online version

External links
Homepage of Yümjiriin Mönkh-Amgalan at the National University of Mongolia, with a listing of his Mongolian-language papers about MSL

Sign languages
Languages of Mongolia